The Detroit Autorama, also known as America's Greatest Hot Rod Show, is a showcase of custom cars and hot rods held each year at TCF Center in Detroit, Michigan, in either late February or early March.

It is promoted by Championship Auto Shows Incorporated (CASI) and hosted by Michigan Hot Rod Association (MHRA), part of the International Show Car Association (ISCA) schedule for the Summit Racing Equipment Show Car Series, which includes other prestigious show car events such as the Chicago World of Wheels and Houston Autorama.

The Detroit Autorama is best known as home to the Don Ridler Memorial Award, which is presented to the "best in show" at each year's event, and has been won by many well-known car designers and builders, such as Chip Foose, Jerry Pennington, Troy Trepanier, and Bobby Alloway.

History 
The first Detroit Autorama was held at the University of Detroit Memorial Building on January 31 and February 1, 1953. It featured only 40 cars, and was hosted by members of the Michigan Hot Rod Association (MHRA), which was created only a year before to "organize small local clubs into one unified body that could raise the money needed to pull drag racing off the streets and into a safe environment". Eventually, the MHRA grew to also include clubs from the customizing and hot rodding scene, such as the Motor City Modified, Bearing Burners and Spark Plugs, who combined efforts to pull-off the first event, along with other Detroit Car Clubs such as The Road Kings, Shifters, and Milwinders.

For the second show, activities were moved to the Michigan State Fairgrounds Colosseum, where it was held from 1954 to 1960. For the fourth event in 1956, the Michigan Hot Rod Association (MHRA) hired local band and sporting-event promoter Don Ridler to help the show reach a broader audience. Ridler served as the show's first true promoter until his death in 1963. The following year, the Michigan Hot Rod Association (MHRA) created a "best in show" award for Autorama, named after the man who made the biggest impact in the show's first eleven years, and thus the Ridler Award was born.

The 9th Annual Detroit Autorama was the first to be held at the new Cobo Hall. That year featured a new-record 230 cars competing, and filled all  of Cobo's lower-level basement. The 1961 show's last day also broke the event attendance record by drawing a crowd of approximately 35,000 people. During these early years at Cobo, the event began to attract industry names from outside the Motor City, including George Barris, Darryl Starbird, Carl Casper, and "Big Daddy" Ed Roth. And as part of Ford Motor Company's "Ford Custom Car Caravan", the show also generated attention from other big name customizers, including Bill Cushenbery, Jack Florence, Dean Jeffries, and Gene Winfield.

Though the show was by then in its twelfth year, it was in 1964 the Don Ridler Memorial Award was introduced as the event's top prize. The inaugural Don Ridler Award went to Macomb's Al Bergler, with a Competition slingshot dragster. (Bergler went on to be known in the National Hot Rod Association (NHRA) as driver of the Motown Shaker Top Fuel Funny Car).

Following Bergler's win in 1964, the next ten years saw both a growth in the number of exhibitors, as well as the number of professional custom car builders competing for the show's new top prize. From 1965 to 1973, all nine Ridler-winning entries were either owned, or built, by Larry and Mike Alexander, Jerry Pennington, or George Busti-all of whom were professional builders.

The 1970s brought on unique cars to wn the Ridler. Jerry Pennington's rear-engine Corvette (Scorpion) and hand-built custom street rod (Devilfish) featured many of the era's trends, including shag carpeting, velvet seating, and sharp edges. 1974's event was a first for Autorama, as Wimauma, Florida's Don Campbell and his '27 Ford became the first out-of-state entry to capture the Ridler Award. The decade was then capped-off with a series of six Ford T-bucket Ridler winners, including three '23s ('76, '78, '79), two '27s ('74 & '75), and one '26 ('77). The Ford roadster trend continued throughout the 1980s as well, with two '34s ('81 & '82), a '28 ('80), a '29 ('83), a '33 ('85) and a '35 ('84). The first non-roadster to win the Ridler since 1973 was Dale Hunt's late-model Pro Stock Pontiac Grand Am at the 34th annual Detroit Autorama in 1986. Hunt's Grand Am remains one of only two Pro Stock cars to have won the Ridler (the other being Bob Rizzoli's '92 Mercedes 560 SEC).

Throughout the 1980s and 90s, the Autorama continued to grow into one of the most prestigious car shows in the country. To assist in growing, the next generation of professional builders and renowned car owners began to make their way to Cobo every winter in hopes of capturing the much-desired Ridler Award. Among them were California's Bobby Alloway and Boyd Coddington, Memphis' George Poteet, along with many others. The only downside to this growing national attention was Michigan's dwindling presence. As exhibitors started traveling from across the country to fight for the show's top prize, many local Detroit and Michigan entries became less competitive against cars from other states, most of whom were being built with much larger budgets. Though the Alexander Brothers continued to build local cars for the show (including a Great-8 competitor in 2012), to date, Rochester Hills's Dave Emery's '32 Ford Roadster ( Revolver) was in 1997 the last Michigan-built entries to win the Ridler Award.

The new millennium brought forth a new form of styling and look to the Ridler and Great 8 cars. It also brought with it yet another generation of professional car builders. Wes Rydell's '35 Chevy Grand Master became designer Chip Foose's first build to win the award in 2002. Foose returned again the following year with a '34 Ford, Stallion, for Arizona's Ron Whiteside, which made him only the third builder in the show's history, and the first since Jerry Pennington, to win the award two consecutive years in-a-row.

Foose returned again in 2005 with a '36 Ford (Impression), built for Littleton, Colorado's Ken Reister. It was with Impression Foose set a record, becoming the first builder to ever win three Ridler Awards, having won them all in a four-year span. Foose would snap his own record yet again ten years later, when his '65 Chevy Impala (Imposter, built for Don and Elma Voth) captured his fourth Ridler in 2015.

Beginning in 2007, Ridler cars transitioned from individual-builds to group-builds. Ross and Beth Myer's '36 Ford (First Love) was the first Ridler-winning car to be built by a custom car shop in the modern era (they hired "Rad Rides By Troy" owner/operator Troy Trepanier). The transition continued with 2010 winner Tammy Ray and her '34 Ford Phaeton, Gold Digger, built by T & T Customs' owner/operator Ted Thompson, 2012 winner Dwayne Peace and his '55 T-bird, built by Torq'd Design Lab & Greening Auto Company, and 2013 winner Rob & Deb Cizek and their 1940 Ford Coupe Checkered Past, built by Cal Customs.

In recent years, the roadster trend has begun to fade. Since 2008, only four roadsters or pre-1940 cars have won the Ridler (Ray's Gold Digger, the Cizeks' Checkered Past, Doug Cooper's '32 Ford Duecenberg, and Billy Thomas' |Olds Cool). Also, another streak dating back to Dave Emery's 1997 winner was snapped in 2014, when Osoyoos, British Columbia's J.F Launier and his '64 Buick Riviera won the Ridler as a single owner/builder entry.

In 2002, the Detroit Autorama celebrated its 50th anniversary with special promotions from Murray's Auto Parts, and inducted an honorary list of "50 People Who Made a Difference" during that year's "Ridler Ball". A hall of fame, entitled "The Autorama: Circle of Champions", was also introduced in 1997, and has inducted at least one member every year<!...--> since. Inductees include George Barris (1999), Ed Roth (2000), Crain Communications' Keith Crain (2003), Street Rodder's Brian Brennan (2010), Chip Foose (2013), and Hurst Shifter girl Linda Vaughn (2014). Autorama also introduced for their 50th anniversary a special "Builder/Owner of the Year" award-presented every year to a past Ridler-winning or major show contributor. The winner is honored at the annual Ridler Ball in Cobo's ball room, and is featured in a special exhibit within the show which showcases the owner/builder's previous work. Past "Builders of the Year" include the Alexander Brothers (2002), Blackie Gejeian (2004), Ed Roth (2006), So-Cal Speed Shop (2007), Gene Winfield (2008), Darryl Starbird (2009), Bobby Alloway (2011), and Troy Trepanier (2014).

To celebrate the 50th anniversary of the Ridler Award in 2013, the 61st annual Detroit Autorama "Builder of the Year" exhibit was replaced with the largest gathering of former Ridler-winning cars ever assembled. Some of the cars included in the exhibition were Al Bergler's Aggravation, the Alexander Brothers' Venturian, Pennington's Devilfish, Bob Rizzoli's '92 Mercedes, Rydell's Grandmaster, Reister's Impression, Ray's Gold Digger, Bruce Rick's |Suncammer, and Peace's '55 Thunderbird. In addition to the gathering of former Ridler-cars, the exhibit included a special Saturday-autograph session, which brought out names like Bergler, Alloway, and Foode-to sign commemorative "50th Anniversary Artwork" with each of their cars on it. To cap-off the celebration, the winners of the 50th Ridler Award (Rob & Deb Cizek & their 1940 Ford "Checkered Past") were presented with a one-of-a-kind Gold Ridler trophy unlike any given-before or after.

The Detroit Autorama has been put together in-collaboration between the Michigan Hot Rod Association (MHRA) and Championship Auto Shows (CASI) since 1961. In 1963, CASI President Bob Larivee Sr. helped the Michigan Hot Rod Association (MHRA) form a new governing body for show car events, titled the International Show Car Association (ISCA). The ISCA has since become the leading promoter and governing body of show car events and competitions in the country. Along with CASI (now "North America's largest producer of indoor hot rod shows") they co-promote and judge events from coast-to-coast, ranging from the Boston World of Wheels to the Grand National Roadster Show in Pomona, California. All ISCA events have a series of "Outstanding Awards" for more than three-dozen classes. Each one counts as a single point in the ISCA point standings, which is split into four overall classes: Rod, Custom, Truck, and Bike. If at the end of a season, a single contributor has four Outstanding Awards in a single category, they are locked-into the ISCA Championship Finals, which is held every as part of the Chicago World of Wheels, the week following the show at Cobo. Many Ridler Winners and Great-8 cars have gone-on to attend other ISCA shows and win an overall Class Championship. Most recently Tammy Ray and her '34 Gold Digger did so in back-to-back seasons in 2010 & 2011.

The most events ever on an ISCA schedule was 99, set during the 1982–83 season. The current schedule features 30 events, including the Detroit Autorama, and the ISCA Championship Finals-held within the Chicago World of Wheels. It promotes and judges shows in 14 states and four provinces, and typically runs from Thanksgiving weekend through mid-April.

Ridler Award
Autorama's "best in show" award is the Don Ridler Memorial Award, named after Don Ridler, a former Michigan State Football Player, Lawrence Tech Basketball and Football Coach and Athletic Director, and Autorama's first promoter from 1956–1963.

It was awarded for the first time at the 12th annual Autorama in 1964, and has been awarded every year since.

The Pirelli "Great 8" 

Since 1970, the Ridler Award recipient has been selected out of a pre-determined group of cars, known as "The Great 8", sponsored by Pirelli Tires.

On the application for Autorama, a box is to be checked to indicate to the promotional staff if the submitted entry is a Ridler contender. Those entries who've checked-off the box on their applications are told to move into Cobo the Wednesday before the show, a full day ahead of other exhibitors. Then on Thursday Night before the show opens, the ISCA judging staff goes through all the Ridler Contenders, and sort-out which eight of them outweigh the rest.  These "Great 8" entries were formally announced during the annual Ridler Ball inside the Cobo Ballroom the Friday Night of the show, but are now announced earlier in the day, usually before the show opens to the public at noon on Friday, in order to accommodate online-publications and social media outlets. Each car has a banner within its display, distinguishing it as part of the "Pirelli Great 8".On Friday night, while the owners and builders are attending the Ridler Ball, an entire staff of ISCA Judges are assigned to solely the Great 8 cars, and go through each one before making a final decision the following morning. Once a decision is made, the winner is announced during the Sunday Night Awards Ceremony-again in the Ballroom; after all Great-8 owners have been previously brought-up on stage, and a short video presentation showcasing all eight-nominees to the tune of Europe's "Final Countdown"-is completed.

The Ridler Award is presented to the winner by the management of GM Performance Parts, and is also given an embroidered jacket and a $10,000 check. Along with receiving a personal Ridler Award with only their name engraved in it, the owner's name is also engraved among the list of past recipients on the full-scale Ridler trophy, which is kept at GM Performance's Headquarters in Auburn Hills, Michigan.

The criteria to win the Ridler is to be the "most outstanding from among the cars being shown for the first time". It must also have "limited media exposure" prior to the event, and must be "minimally operable", which requires it to "start, stop, move forward and backward under its own power, turn left and right and stop using the brake pedal".

The 53 recipients of the Don Ridler Memorial Award are shown below:

Past winners

See also
Motorama
Cobo Center

References

External links
 http://www.mhraonline.org
 Autorama Online
 2009 brief history of Autorama since 1953, including leadership by Bob Larivee, Promotions, Inc.
 Autorama#58 - Detroit Free Press 2/28/2010 gallery of 16 photos plus link to story
 Autorama#58 - gallery of 78 photos, Detroit News 3 January 2012

Further reading 
 Larivee, Bob. (2015). Hot Rod Detroit. Oxford, Michigan: DP Publishing. .
 Tregembo, Joseph T. (2015). The Illustrated History of the Roseville High School Auto Shop. Blurb Publishing. .

Auto shows in the United States
Events in Detroit
1953 establishments in Michigan